Henry Bradford Washburn Jr. (June 7, 1910 – January 10, 2007) was an American explorer, mountaineer, photographer, and cartographer. He established the Boston Museum of Science, served as its director from 1939–1980, and from 1985 until his death served as its Honorary Director (a lifetime appointment). Bradford married Barbara Polk in 1940, they honeymooned in Alaska making the first ascent of Mount Bertha together.

Washburn is especially noted for exploits in four areas. 
He was one of the leading American mountaineers in the 1920s through the 1950s, putting up first ascents and new routes on many major Alaskan peaks, often with his wife, Barbara Washburn, one of the pioneers among female mountaineers and the first woman to summit Denali (Mount McKinley).
He pioneered the use of aerial photography in the analysis of mountains and in planning mountaineering expeditions. His thousands of striking black-and-white photos, mostly of Alaskan peaks and glaciers, are known for their wealth of informative detail and their artistry. They are the reference standard for route photos of Alaskan climbs.
He was responsible for creating maps of various mountain ranges, including Denali, Mount Everest, and the Presidential Range in New Hampshire.
His stewardship of the Boston Museum of Science.

Several of these achievements – e.g. the Everest map and subsequent further work on the elevation and geology of Everest – were carried out when Washburn was in his 70s and 80s.

Biography
Washburn was born on June 7, 1910, in Cambridge, Massachusetts, to a Boston Brahmin family whose roots trace back to Mayflower passenger Elder William Brewster.  Brewster was the Pilgrim colonist leader and a spiritual elder of the Plymouth Colony.

Washburn's father, the Very Rev. Henry Bradford Washburn Sr., was an avid outdoorsman, and was dean of the Episcopal Theological School in Cambridge, Massachusetts. Washburn's mother was Edith Buckingham Hall.

His younger brother was Sherwood Larned Washburn, nicknamed  "Sherry", who was a physical anthropologist and pioneer in the field of primatology.

He received an undergraduate degree from Harvard University, where he was a member of the Harvard Mountaineering Club. He returned to Harvard to earn a master's degree in geology and geography in 1960.

Washburn was an avid pilot and made his first solo flight in a Fleet biplane at Boeing Field in Seattle in 1934.  He earned his private flying license at Roosevelt Field on Long Island later that year.

Expeditions
Washburn embarked on a notable expedition in 1937 to 17,147 feet (5,226 m) Mount Lucania in the Yukon. He called upon Bob Reeve, a famous Alaskan bush pilot, who later replied by cable to Washburn, "Anywhere you'll ride, I'll fly". The ski-equipped Fairchild F-51 made several trips to the landing site on the glacier without event in May, but on landing with Washburn and Bates in June, the plane sank into unseasonal slush. Washburn, Bates and Reeve pressed hard for five days to get the airplane out and Reeve was eventually able to get the airplane airborne with all excess weight removed and the assistance of a smooth icefall with a steep drop. Washburn and Bates continued on foot to make the first ascent of Lucania, and after an epic descent and journey to civilization, they hiked over 150 miles through the wilderness to safety in the small town of Burwash Landing. As Reeve had been unable to return to the glacier with his aircraft, Washburn and Bates chose to leave behind or dump a  cache of supplies. This cache was located and recovered in 2022.

Honors

Washburn was elected a fellow of the American Academy of Arts and Sciences in 1956.

Washburn gathered many awards over the course of his career, including nine honorary doctorates.

In 1979, he received Gold Medal of the Royal Scottish Geographical Society for "outstanding contributions to cartographic research."

He and his wife received two awards from the National Geographic Society.  In 1980, they received the Alexander Graham Bell Medal, and in 1988 they received the Centennial Award.

In 1979, he received Gold Medal of the Royal Scottish Geographical Society for "outstanding contributions to cartographic research."

In 1998, he was awarded the Royal Geographical Society's Cherry Kearton Medal and Award.

In 1994, he received King Albert Medal of Merit from Belgium's King Albert Foundation in recognition of "his guiding spirit in the ambitious and successful enterprise of making a new large-scale map of the roof of the world from 1982 to 1991."

Death
Washburn died of heart failure on January 10, 2007, at the age of 96, in a retirement home in Lexington, Massachusetts. In addition to his wife, he left a son, Edward, and two daughters, Dorothy and Elizabeth.

Bradford Washburn American Mountaineering Museum
The Bradford Washburn American Mountaineering Museum (BWAMM) is devoted to mountaineering, the mountains, science and art, and the dissemination of knowledge – all things that Washburn exemplified. BWAMM is a joint project of the American Alpine Club, Colorado Mountain Club, and National Geographic Society, and is located in Golden, Colorado, Feb. 16, 2008.

Selected Alaskan first ascents
 1933:  Pointed Peak, Fairweather Range, Saint Elias Mountains
 1934: East Ridge above the Plateau Mount Crillon, Fairweather Range, Alaska, USA. FA with H. Adams Carter, summit attained July 19, 1934.
 1937: Mount Lucania, Saint Elias Mountains, Yukon, Canada
 1938: Mount Marcus Baker, Chugach Mountains
 1938: Mount Sanford, Wrangell Mountains
 1940: Mount Bertha, Fairweather Range, Saint Elias Mountains
 1941: Mount Hayes, Alaska Range
 1944: Mount Deception, Alaska Range
 1947: McGonagall Mountain, Alaska Range
 1951: West Buttress Route on Denali, Alaska Range
 1951: Kahiltna Dome, Alaska Range
 1955: Mount Dickey, Alaska Range

Footnotes

Sources
 Washburn, Brad (1927) Among the Alps with Bradford New York: G.P. Putnam's Sons
 Washburn, Brad (1928) Bradford on Mount Washington New York: G.P. Putnam's Sons

 
 
 
 
 Washburn, Bradford (1971) A tourist guide to Mount McKinley Anchorage, Alaska: Northwest Pub. Co. OCLC 154993
 Washburn, Bradford (1980) Resurvey of the heart of the Grand Canyon, 1971-1978 : final report National Geographic Society (U.S.), Cartographic Division; Boston Museum of Science
 Washburn, Bradford and Roberts, David (1991) Mount McKinley: the conquest of Denali New York: Abrams  
 
 Decaneas, Antony and Washburn, Brad (1999) Bradford Washburn: Mountain Photography Boston: Museum of Fine Arts 
 
 Washburn, Bradford and Smith, Donald (2002) On High: The Adventures of Legendary Mountaineer, Photographer, and Scientist Brad Washburn National Geographic 
 
 Sfraga, Michael (2004) Bradford Washburn : a life of exploration Corvallis: Oregon State University Press, 
 Washburn, Bradford and Freedman, Lew (2005) Bradford Washburn: an extraordinary life Portland, Oregon: WestWinds Press, 
 
 Roberts, David  (2009) The Last of His Kind: The Life and Adventures of Bradford Washburn, America's Boldest Mountaineer HarperCollins

External links
Washburn Gallery The Mount Washington Observatory's Washburn Gallery offers framed and unframed prints of much of Bradford Washburn's early work.
Photographing In High Places A portfolio of ten photographs from the Alaska Range and the Yukon made between 1938 and 1978.
Memorial film: "Remembering Brad Washburn"
Bradford Washburn American Mountaineering Museum
Bradford Washburn photographic prints at Lumiere Gallery

1910 births
2007 deaths
People from Cambridge, Massachusetts
Groton School alumni
Harvard Graduate School of Arts and Sciences alumni
Aerial photographers
Nature photographers
American mountain climbers
Denali
Fellows of the American Academy of Arts and Sciences
American cartographers
National Geographic Society medals recipients
20th-century cartographers